Golden Airport  is located near the town of Golden, British Columbia, Canada.

References

External links

Registered aerodromes in British Columbia
Columbia Valley